BPC-157 (also known as PL 14736) is a pentadecapeptide. It has the amino acid sequence Gly-Glu-Pro-Pro-Pro-Gly-Lys-Pro-Ala-Asp-Asp-Ala-Gly-Leu-Val. This peptide has a molecular formula of C62H98N16O22. The PUBCHEM ID is CID 9941957.

The peptide is banned by the World Anti-Doping Agency in 2022 under the S0 category of non-exempt substances.

Research 

There are some tentative pre-clinical studies on animals and in vitro suggesting possible benefit in wound healing and bowel disorders although all of these studies come from a single research group.

Unapproved marketing
BPC 157 is marketed heavily in functional medicine. There are neither randomized controlled trials of BPC-157 in humans nor clinical evidence of its benefit in human physiology.

References 

Peptides